Isoparorchiidae is a family of trematodes belonging to the order Plagiorchiida.

Genera:
 Isoparorchis Southwell, 1913

References

Plagiorchiida